Ikechukwu Onyeka  is a Nigerian film director.

Early life and education 
Onyeka is from Umuoji, Idemili North local government in Anambra State. In 2012, he enrolled at Colorado Film School to study cinematography. He highlighted his quest to get optimal knowledge in film-making as his reason for taking a break to return to school.

Career 
Prior to film-making, Onyeka was an okada rider. Between 1998 and 2006, he directed 70 films and produced thirteen. Onyeka ventured into Nollywood as a property manager, before becoming a production manager, producer, the assistant director then director. According to him, he didn't like acting because of the publicity that comes along with it. He has also founded his production company, Lykon pictures. Onyeka is described as one of the "most accomplished directors" in Nollywood. In 2010, during an interview in New York, he stated that having worked with most big names in the industry, Genevieve Nnaji is arguably the "only star in Nollywood", he cited her professionalism as a reason for this. He explained that other actors were popular, but not stars. He also described Mercy Johnson as the most popular face in the film industry.

Filmography 
Unforeseen
Eagle's Bride
Slave To Lust
Warrior's Heart
The Captain
Corporate Maid
Intimidation
Reloaded
A Private Storm
Mr and Mrs
 The Grave Dust
Forgetting June
Brother's Keeper

References

External links

Nigerian film directors
20th-century Nigerian male actors
Living people
Year of birth missing (living people)
Igbo male actors
Nigerian male television actors
Nigerian film producers
Nigerian male film actors
Actors from Anambra State
21st-century Nigerian actors